Łabędź (Polish for "Swan") is a Polish coat of arms. It was used by many noble families known as szlachta in Polish in medieval Poland and later under the Polish–Lithuanian Commonwealth, branches of the original medieval Duninowie Grand Duke family (Łabędzie) family as well as families connected with the Clan by adoption.

History

Blazon

Gules a swan passant Argent beaked and legged Or.

Notable bearers
Notable bearers of this coat of arms have included:
 Duninowie Grand Duke family
 Piotr Włostowic (1080–1153)
 Marcin Dunin Grand Duke archbishop
 Hrabia, Grand Duke (Count, Grand Duke) Rodryg Dunin (1870–1928)
 Hrabia Antoni Dunin (1907–1939)
 Teodor Bujnicki
 Mszczuj of Skrzynno
 Lucjan Żeligowski
 August Zaleski
 Krzysztof Zawisza
 Stanislav Szemet
 Michail Szemet (Шемет)

Gallery

Szpot variations

See also
 Polish heraldry
 Heraldic family
 List of Polish nobility coats of arms

Bibliography
 Tadeusz Gajl: Herbarz polski od średniowiecza do XX wieku : ponad 4500 herbów szlacheckich 37 tysięcy nazwisk 55 tysięcy rodów. L&L, 2007. .
 Herby szlachty polskiej, S. Górzyński, J.Kochanowski, Warszawa 1992.

References

Polish coats of arms